Ron Nelson may refer to:

Ron Nelson (composer) (born 1929), American composer of both classical and popular music and music academic
Ron Nelson (basketball) (born 1946), American basketball player, played one season in the ABA
Ron Nelson (DJ) (born 1962 or 1963), Canadian hip hop and reggae DJ, broadcaster, music producer and promoter